Karbala or Kerbala (also  ;) is a city in central Iraq, located about  southwest of Baghdad, and a few miles east of Lake Milh, also known as Razzaza Lake. Karbala is the capital of Karbala Governorate, and has an estimated population of 1,218,732 people (2018).

The city, best known as the location of the Battle of Karbala in 680 AD, or for the shrines of Hussain and Al Abbas, is considered a holy city for Shia Muslims, in the same way as Mecca, Medina and Jerusalem. Tens of millions of Shi'ite Muslims visit the site twice a year, rivaling Mecca and Mashhad by the number of pilgrims annually. The martyrdom of Husayn ibn Ali is commemorated annually by millions of Shi'ites.

Up to 34 million pilgrims visit the city to observe ʿĀshūrāʾ (the tenth day of the month of Muharram), which marks the anniversary of Husayn's death, but the main event is the Arbaʿīn (the 40th day after 'Ashura'), where up to 40 million visit the graves. Most of the pilgrims travel on foot from all around Iraq and more than 56 countries.

Etymology

There are many opinions among different investigators, as to the origin of the word "Karbala". Some have pointed out that "Karbala" has a connection to the "Karbalato" language, while others attempt to derive the meaning of word "Karbala" by analyzing its spelling and language. They conclude that it originates from the Arabic word "Kar Babel" which was a group of ancient Babylonian villages that included Nainawa, Al-Ghadiriyya, Karbella (Karb Illu. as in Arba Illu [Arbil]), Al-Nawaweess, and Al-Heer. This last name is today known as Al-Hair and is where Husayn ibn Ali's grave is located.

The investigator Yaqut al-Hamawi had pointed out that the meaning of "Karbala" could have several explanations, one of which is that the place where Husayn ibn Ali was martyred is made of soft earth—"Al-Karbalat".

According to Shia's belief, the archangel Gabriel narrated the true meaning of the name Karbalā to Muhammad: a combination of karb (the land which will cause many agonies) and balā (afflictions)."

Climate 
Karbala experiences a hot desert climate (BWh in the Köppen climate classification) with extremely hot, long, dry summers and mild winters. Almost all of the yearly precipitation is received between November and April, though no month is wet.

History

Battle of Karbala

The Battle of Karbala was fought on the bare deserts on the way to Kufa on October 10, AD 680 (10 Muharram 61 AH). Both Husayn ibn Ali and his brother Abbas ibn Ali were buried by the local Banī Asad tribe, at what later became known as the Mashhad Al-Husayn. The battle itself occurred as a result of Husain's refusal of Yazid I's demand for allegiance to his caliphate. The Kufan governor, Ubaydallah ibn Ziyad, sent thirty thousand horsemen against Husayn as he traveled to Kufa.  Husayn had no army, he was with his family and few friends who joined them, so there were around 73 men, including a 6-month-old Ali Asghar, son of Imam Husayn, in total. The horsemen, under 'Umar ibn Sa'd, were ordered to deny Husayn and his followers water in order to force Husayn to agree to give an oath of allegiance. On the 9th of Muharram, Husayn refused, and asked to be given the night to pray. On 10 Muharram, Husayn ibn Ali prayed the morning prayer and led his troops into battle along with his brother Abbas. Many of Husayn's followers, including all of his present sons Ali Akbar, Ali Asghar (six months old) and his nephews Qassim, Aun and Muhammad were killed.

In 63 AH (AD AD), Yazid ibn Mu'awiya released the surviving members of Husayn's family from prison as there was a threat of uprisings and some of the people in his court were unaware of who the battle was with, when they got to know that the descendants of Muhammad were killed, they were horrified. On their way to Mecca, they stopped at the site of the battle. There is record of Sulayman ibn Surad going on pilgrimage to the site as early as 65 AH (685 AD). The city began as a tomb and shrine to Husayn ibn Ali, grandson of Muhammad and son of Ali ibn Abi Talib, and grew as a city in order to meet the needs of pilgrims. The city and tombs were greatly expanded by successive Muslim rulers, but suffered repeated destruction from attacking armies. The original shrine was destroyed by the Abbasid Caliph Al-Mutawakkil in 850 but was rebuilt in its present form around 979, only to be partly destroyed by fire in 1086 and rebuilt yet again.

Early modern
Like Najaf, the city suffered from severe water shortages that were only resolved in the early 18th century by building a dam at the head of the Husayniyya Canal. In 1737, the city replaced Isfahan in Iran as the main centre of Shia scholarship. In the mid-eighteenth century it was dominated by the dean of scholarship, Yusuf Al Bahrani, a key proponent of the Akhbari tradition of Shia thought, until his death in 1772, after which the more state-centric Usuli school became more influential.

The Wahhabi sack of Karbala occurred on 21 April 1802 (1216 Hijri) (1801), under the rule of Abdul-Aziz bin Muhammad the second ruler of the First Saudi State, when 12,000 Wahhabi Muslims from Najd attacked the city of Karbala. The attack was coincident with the anniversary of Ghadir Khum event, or 10 Muharram. This fight left 3,000–5,000 deaths and the dome of the tomb of Husayn ibn Ali, was destroyed.  The fight lasted for 8 hours.After the First Saudi State invasion, the city enjoyed semi-autonomy during Ottoman rule, governed by a group of gangs and mafia variously allied with members of the 'ulama. In order to reassert their authority, the Ottoman army laid siege to the city. On January 13, 1843, Ottoman troops entered the city. Many of the city leaders fled leaving defense of the city largely to tradespeople. About 3,000 Arabs were killed in the city, and another 2,000 outside the walls (this represented about 15% of the city's normal population). The Turks lost 400 men. This prompted many students and scholars to move to Najaf, which became the main Shia religious centre. Between 1850 and 1903, Karbala enjoyed a generous influx of money through the Oudh Bequest. The Shia-ruled Indian Province of Awadh, known by the British as Oudh, had always sent money and pilgrims to the holy city. The Oudh money, 10 million rupees, originated in 1825 from the Awadh Nawab Ghazi-ud-Din Haider. One third was to go to his wives, and the other two-thirds went to holy cities of Karbala and Najaf. When his wives died in 1850, the money piled up with interest in the hands of the British East India Company. The EIC sent the money to Karbala and Najaf per the wives' wishes, in the hopes of influencing the Ulama in Britain's favor. This effort to curry favor is generally considered to have been a failure.

In 1915, Karbala was the scene of an uprising against the Ottoman Empire.

In 1928, an important drainage project was carried out to relieve the city of unhealthy swamps, formed between Hussainiya and the Bani Hassan Canals on the Euphrates.

Defense of the City Hall in Karbala – a series of skirmishes fought from April 3 to April 6, 2004, between the Iraqi rebels of the Mahdi Army trying to conquer the city hall and the defending Polish and Bulgarian soldiers from the Multinational Division Central-South

In 2003 following the US invasion of Iraq, the Karbala town council attempted to elect United States Marine Corps Lieutenant Colonel Matthew Lopez as mayor. Ostensibly so that his marines, contractors, and funds couldn't leave.

On January 19, 2008, 2 million Iraqi Shia pilgrims marched through Karbala city, Iraq to commemorate Ashura. 20,000 Iraqi troops and police guarded the event amid tensions due to clashes between Iraqi troops and Shia which left 263 people dead (in Basra and Nasiriya).

Religious tourism

Karbala, alongside Najaf, is considered a thriving tourist destination for Shia Muslims and the tourism industry in the city boomed after the end of Saddam Hussein's rule. Some religious tourism attractions include:

 Al Abbas Mosque
 Imam Husayn Shrine
 Euphrates

Airports
Airports in Karbala include:
Karbala Northeast Airport
Karbala International Airport (located to the southeast of Karbala)

Religious beliefs

Mesopotamia in the Quran

Some Shi'ites consider this verse of the Quran to refer to Iraq, land of the Shi'ite sacred sites of Kufah, Najaf, Karbala, Kadhimiyyah and Samarra, since the Monotheistic preachers Ibrāhīm (Abraham) and Lūṭ (Lot), who are regarded as Prophets in Islam, are believed to have lived in the ancient Iraqi city of Kutha Rabba, before going to "The Blessed Land".

Aside from the story of Abraham and Lot in Polytheistic Mesopotamia, there are passages in the Quran about Mount Judi, Babil ("Babylon") and Qaryat Yunus ("Town of Jonah").

Hadith
There are many Shia traditions that narrate the status of Karbala:

Thus the tomb of the martyred Imam has acquired this great significance in Shi'ite tradition because the Imam and his fellow martyrs are seen as models of jihad in the way of God. Shi'ites believe that Karbala is one of the holiest places on Earth according to the following traditions (among others):
 The angel Gabriel narrated to Muhammad that:

 The fourth Shi'ite Imam, that is Zayn al-Abidin narrated:

 In this regard, Ja'far al-Sadiq narrates, 'Allah, the Almighty, has made the dust of my ancestor's grave – Imam Husain (r.a) as a cure for every sickness and safety from every fear.'
 It is narrated from Ja'far that: "The earth of the pure and holy grave of Husayn ibn ‘Ali (r.a) is a pure and blessed musk. For those who consume it, it is a cure for every ailment, and if our enemy uses it then he will melt the way fat melts, when you intend to consume that pure earth recite the following supplication"

Culture

Sports

Karbalaa FC is a football club based in Karbala.

Media
There are many references in books in films to "Karbala", generally referring to Husayn's death at the Battle of Karbala. Husayn is often depicted on a white horse impaled by arrows. There are films and documentaries about the events of Karbala in both animated and realistic form

University

Hawza are the Islamic education institutions that are run collectively by mujtahid or Allamas to teach Shia Muslims and guide them through the rigorous journey of becoming an Alim. In terms of the hawaz in Karbala, After the death of a renowned Alama, the Sayyid Muhammad, the leadership in terms of teacher shifted to taqlid to mujtahid. This was a significant factor that lead to the leadership of Ulama to reside in Karbala and as well as Najaf. Initially Karbala's hawza (Islamic education institution) consisted mostly of Iranians and Turkish Ulama. After the death of Sharif-ul-Ulama Mazandarani in 1830 and the repression of the shia population by the Ottomans in 1843 both played an important role in the relocation of many Ulamas and thus Najaf becoming the center of Shia Islamic leadership in education.

As of now, there are two universities in Karbala. University of Karbala, which was inaugurated on March 1, 2002, is one of the top most universities in Iraq regarding academic administration, human resources, and scientific research. The Ahl Al Bayt University was founded in September 2003 by Dr. Mohsen Baqir Mohammed-Salih Al-Qazwini. The university has six major colleges: College of Law, Arts, Islamic Sciences, Medical & Health Technology, Pharmacy and Dentistry.

Warith al-Anbiya University in Karbala, has recently been established under a project of Husayn Holy Shrine, having the faculties of engineering, administration, economics, law and pathology, which is ready to receive students for the first academic year 2017–2018.

Indian subcontinent
In the Indian subcontinent, Karbala, apart from meaning the city of Karbala (which is usually referred to as Karbala-e-Mualla meaning Karbala the exalted), also means local grounds where commemorative processions end and/or ta'zīya are buried during Ashura or Arba'een, usually such grounds will have shabeeh (copy) of Rauza or some other structures.

In South Asia where ta'zīya refer to specifically to the miniature mausoleums used in processions held in Muharram. It all started from the fact that the great distance of India from Karbala prevented Indian Shi'is being buried near the tomb of Husayn or making frequent pilgrimages (ziyarat) to the tomb. This is the reason why Indian Shi'is established local karbalas on the subcontinent by bringing soil from Karbala and sprinkling it on lots designated as future cemeteries. Once the karbalas were established on the subcontinent, the next step was to bring Husayn's tomb-shrine to India. This was established by building replicas of Husayn's mausoleum called ta'zīya to be carried in Muharram processions. Thousands of ta'zīyas in various shapes and sizes are made every year for the months of mourning of Muharram and Safar; and are carried in processions and may be buried at the end of Ashura or Arba'een.

See also
 Battle of Karbala
 1977 Shia uprising in Iraq
 Battle of Karbala (1991)
Battle of Karbala (2003)
 2003 Karbala bombings
 2004 Ashura massacre
 2007 Karbala mosque bombings
Karbala raid
 Arba'een
 Karbala, Iran

Explanatory notes

References

Further reading

Published in the 19th century

Published in the 20th century

Published in the 21st century

External links

Shia Shrines of Karbala – Sacred Destinations
Shia Karbala Poetry 
Karbala – A Lesson for Mankind (archived)
Karbala Quotes and Sayings
Karbala and Martyrdom
Karbala – The Facts and the Fairy-tales
Karbala, the Chain of Events

 
Holy cities
Shia holy cities
Populated places in Karbala Province
District capitals of Iraq
Cities in Iraq
Levant
Husayn ibn Ali
Karbala Governorate